Rongberonger Korhi is a 2017 India-Bengali film written and directed by Bengali filmmaker Ranjan Ghosh. This is the director's second film after his debut with the cult hit Hrid Majharey. It has been produced by Rupa Datta of Camellia Productions Pvt. Ltd.

The film immediately garnered a lot of interest nationally on its announcement owing to the Demonetisation carried out by the Government of India in November 2016. The act was taking its toll on the country. It is probably the first film in Bengali in which money almost became a separate character.

Ghosh's mentor, acclaimed writer-director-actor Aparna Sen is the creative consultant of the film. She had come on board since she reportedly liked the concept of the different colours of money and after going through the screenplay that she was really impressed with.

Rongberonger Korhi is an anthology of four short stories and features National Award-winning star-actor Rituparna Sengupta, veteran cine star Chiranjeet Chakraborty, critically acclaimed actors Ritwick Chakraborty, Soham Chakraborty, Kharaj Mukherjee, Arunima Ghosh, Arjun Chakrabarty and others.

Plot 
An anthology of four shorts - a different colour of money emerging from each story. The following synopsis is resourced from the Habitat Film Festival site.

First story (Red - Love) - A poor fighting tribal couple seeks divorce from a local judge who charges a big sum of money. After getting the decree, they realize that they are still in love. They need to remarry but there’s no money left. But they don’t give up!

Second story (Blue - Separation) – A young wife learns of her aged husband's accidental death from her lover. The husband has left her a fortune. His death sets her free to reunite with her lover. The two plan their future but a big surprise awaits them.

Third story (Glittery - Profit) – A middle-class man, sacked from his job and ditched by his girlfriend, sits alone in a park. A pimp approaches him and brings him to a prostitute. New to this world, he prefers to chat. What he learns from her shocks him!

Fourth story (White - Loss) – A village boy, a 'Dhaaki' (drummer), leaves his ailing mother and travels to the city to earn money to buy medicines for her. He does get a good amount of what he wants, but loses his mother by the time he returns.

Cast 
All the four stories have three principal characters.
 
 First story
 Arunima Ghosh as Sitarani Murmu, a tribal woman
 Soham Chakraborty as Ramchandra Murmu, a tribal man
 Kharaj Mukherjee as Khagen Chandra Banerjee, a government clerk
 Second story
 Arunima Ghosh as Manda, a young wife
 Chiranjeet Chakraborty as Bijoy, an aged husband
 Arjun Chakrabarty as Mithun, a young lover
 Third story
 Rituparna Sengupta as an unnamed prostitute
 Ritwick Chakraborty as an unnamed client
 Dhee Majumder as an unnamed pimp
 Fourth story
 Rituparna Sengupta as a mother
 Rwitobroto Mukherjee as her son Joga
 Durga idol

Production

Scripting and pre-production 
The first draft of the screenplay was written in 2015 and underwent rewrites till it went into production in September 2016. Initially, these were written as short film projects for the Satyajit Ray Film and Television Institute (SRFTI).

Pre-production spanned over three months from September 2016 till November 2016. Recce was carried out extensively in Kolkata and the suburbs and in the Burdwan and Birbhum districts for budget-friendly locations.

Principal photography and post-production 
The film was shot on the ARRI ALEXA MINI Camera by ace cinematographer Sirsha Ray. The first day of the shoot was on 10 December 2016. The film was shot over a period of 10 days. This aspect of a ten-day shoot seemed to be a regret harboured by the director. In two exclusive interviews to The Statesman newspaper and to a web portal TheMoviean.com, he conceded that he would have preferred a two-week shoot instead.

The film was edited by veteran editor Rabiranjan Maitra, which took three months to be locked. The music production was done by Debojyoti Mishra.

Controversy

Clash with Hindu Right Wing Group 
In December 2017, a little-known Hindu Right Wing Fringe Outfit rose in protest against the film and called for its ban. The film reportedly drew the ire of the Hindu outfit as two of its characters, in one of the four stories, were named after Indian god and goddess, Ram and Sita. The activists of the fringe group, Hindu Jagran Manch, held demonstrations outside the local office of the Central Board of Film Certification (CBFC) on Friday and submitted a deputation seeking changes in the names of the characters. Director Ranjan Ghosh, however, refused to make any changes, calling the protests an attempt to curb his creative freedom. Ghosh said the film had four separate stories about relationships and there was no mythological connection. The spokesperson for the West Bengal unit of Hindu Jagran Manch, Vivek Singh, had written a letter to the Union Information and Broadcasting minister, Smriti Irani, stating that naming the film’s characters after Ram and Sita would hurt the sentiments of Hindus.	

The BJP’s West Bengal unit president Dilip Ghosh said the trend of naming film characters after Hindu Gods or revered mythological characters might harm the sentiments of people of the community.

Support from the national and regional media 
In the clash with the Hindu Right Wing Group, the entire national and regional media rallied around the film in support of the freedom of expression.

The Citizen felt "Did not Ram ask Sita to prove her chastity by passing through the fire? Did not Sita find absolution in finding her way back to the earth she sprung from? So, what is wrong if a film names its characters after mythological names? Don’t we name our own children after the names of mythological characters in the epics and after Gods and Goddesses of the Hindu pantheon like Ganesha, Sita, Radha, Krishna and the like? The first axe to fall would then be Mehboob’s classic Mother India where the “mother” in the title was named Radha. Ramesh Sippy’s bumper hit Seeta Aur Geeta should be recalled and renamed according to the wishes of this Right Wing group who have suddenly decided to become “censors beyond the censors.” Should we then, in retrospect, ask for a change in the names of all films where the characters are named after Gods and Goddesses of the Hindu pantheon and of Indian epics?"

Firstpost wrote "In our country, of course, religion is a low hanging fruit for all kinds of radicalism, and in the absence of any debate, dialogue or civil discussion whatsoever, the names of the film’s characters are being targeted. It is said that there are as many as thirty-three crore gods and goddesses in the Hindu religion. If one were to stop using their names in the arts and literature for fear of retaliation from such self-appointed sentinels of the religion, then there will be no artistic expression left in the country, and our great nation, which was once known all across the globe as an upholder of uninhibited creative freedom, will soon turn into a barren and dark desert of fear and subjugation."

Outlook (magazine) slammed the Right Wing Group stating, "Bengali film "Rong Beronger Kori" has drawn the ire of a Hindu outfit as two of its characters are named after deities Ram and Sita. Director Ranjan Ghosh, however, has refused to make any changes, calling the protests an attempt to curb his creative freedom. The activists of the fringe group, Hindu Jagran Manch, held demonstrations outside the local office of the Central Board of Film Certification (CBFC) today and submitted a deputation seeking changes in the names of the characters. Ghosh said the film has four separate stories about relationships and there is no mythological connection. In one of the four stories, two characters have been named Ram and Sita."

The Hindu lent its support reporting "Mr. Ghosh said the film has four separate stories about relationships and there is no mythological connection. In one of the four stories, two characters have been named Ram and Sita. “Don’t we see people having names like Ram, Lakshman, Sita, Kartik, Saraswati in our everyday life? Do they now want to change those names as well!” he wondered. “It is a question of artistic freedom, a director’s prerogative of creating a work of art. We will protest and object to any bid to curb our freedom,” he asserted."

The Indian Express reported the director's point of view that "“This entire thing is a cheap publicity gimmick by this fringe organisation, which wants to hog the limelight. It is piggybacking the film for publicity. It is an attempt to curb the creative freedom of artists,” he added. Rongberonger Korhi is his second feature film. “It is a love story and there is an element of separation in the film. I will not change the name of my characters and there is a noble thought behind naming the characters. People will come to know about it after watching the film. It has not been done to hurt the sentiment of anyone. On the other hand, no one can dictate what people will be wearing and what they will eat. I will ask the CBFC not to pay heed to the demands of this organisation,” Ghosh said."

The Times of India wrote "When Ritwik Ghatak directed ‘Subarnarekha’, he cast Madhabi Mukherjee in the role of a girl called Sita. Born an orphan, Sita is brought up by her elder brother Ishwar. As the story unfolds, Sita is forced to take up prostitution. By a strange twist of fate, she is one day confronted by the reality of her drunk brother turning up at her brothel as her client. Before the release of this film in 1965, no one said that Ghatak was insulting Hindu sentiments. But 52 years later, the use of Sita’s name for a character played by Arunima Ghosh in Ranjan Ghosh’s ‘Rongberonger Korhi’ has angered the members of the Hindu Jagaran Manch. After verbal and email protests, members of this outfit are giving a deputation to the Central Board of Film Certification (CBFC)."

CBFC Certification 
On 12 January 2018, the Central Board of Film Certification, Kolkata, passed the film without any cuts or modifications, thereby overturning the demands of ban by the fringe outfit Hindu Jagaran Manch. The director lauded the CBFC for taking an objective view of the film without any bias and for not succumbing to any pressure. Film scholars also viewed this development as a very positive sign on the behalf of the CBFC.

Release

Festival participation 
Rongberonger Korhi was selected as a Market Recommended Film at the Dubai Film Market of the 14th edition of the Dubai International Film Festival, that being the only Bengali Film of 2017 to make the cut. The festival was held from 6–13 December 2017, at Dubai, UAE.

The film was further screened on 26 May 2018, at the 13th edition of the prestigious Habitat Film Festival organized by the India Habitat Centre held from 19–27 May 2018, in New Delhi, India. It was reportedly screened before a full house and was greeted with a standing ovation.

Rongberonger Korhi was screened at the Telangana International Bengali Film Festival in Hyderabad held between 7–9 December 2018. It won the Best Film (Critics), Best Director (Critics), Best Actor Female (Critics), Best Supporting Actor Male (Popular) and Jury Special Mention for Kharaj Mukherjee.

The film was selected in the Indian Vista section of the 17th Third Eye Asian Film Festival, Mumbai, 2018, between 14–20 December. It got an overwhelming response from a full house and a 3* critics' rating.

Next, the film was screened at the 9th Asian Film Festival, Pune, held at the National Film Archive of India there from 24–30 December 2018. It was selected in the Indian Vista section.

Rongberonger Korhi was screened in the Cinema of the World section of the 17th Dhaka International Film Festival held between 10–18 January 2019, in Dhaka. The screenings were at the National Library of Bangladesh auditorium and at the Shilpakala Academy of Bangladesh.

The film was selected in the 'Chitrabharati (Indian Cinema) Competition' section of the 11th Bengaluru International Film Festival, 2019, organized by the Karnataka Chalanachitra Academy and supported by the Government of Karnataka. It was held between 21–28 February.

National Film Awards 

The Times of India reported on 1 January 2018, that Rongberonger Korhi could not be sent for the National Film Awards for the year 2017 owing to the pending CBFC Certification, following the row created by the demonstrations and protests by the Hindu fringe group. While rueing this lost opportunity, the director had reportedly mentioned that the issue at stake was more important than any awards.

Theatrical release 

The film eventually released on 23 March to wide positive press and a very positive word-of-mouth publicity but a low key pre-release publicity campaign resulted in a feeble audience response in the opening weekend. It completed a total three-week run in the city theatres and another two-week run in the suburbs, thus totaling a five-week run overall.

References 

2017 films
Indian drama films
2017 drama films
Bengali-language Indian films
2010s Bengali-language films